Laccosperma is a clustering genus of flowering plant in the family palm found in tropical Africa. Poorly studied and rarely cultivated, they are closely related to the genus Eremospatha and with it form a tribe in the Calameae characterized by dyads of hermaphrodite flowers. The genus name combines the Greek words for "reservoir" and "seed".

Description
The trunks are mostly medium to large, clustering, high climbing, and extensively armed with sharp spines. The pinnate leaves are usually large, with spiny petioles, rachises and leaf sheaths. The barbed, linear leaflets are regularly arranged along the rachis and usually hang pendent. The end of the rachis is modified for climbing, featuring double, recurved spines which hook onto forest vegetation. In some species the ocrea, a thin flange where the leaf meets the stem, is enlarged and harbors ants.

As hapaxanths, after a prolonged vegetative period, a brief flowering phase begins which results in the death of individual stems.  They simultaneously produce multiple inflorescences at the top of the trunk, long, once or twice-branched spikes with bisexual flowers. The fruit is small and scaly and contains one seed.

Distribution and habitat
Growing in the tropics of the Congo basin and west Africa, the Laccosperma palms are found in Cameroon, Ghana, Nigeria, and Gabon. They grow in low rainforest mountains and in swamps where they may be used as a source of cane.

References

External links
Laccosperma on NPGS/GRIN
GBIF portal
Fairchild Guide to Palms: Laccosperma

Calamoideae
Arecaceae genera
Taxa named by Carl Georg Oscar Drude